2 Chronicles 18 is the eighteenth chapter of the Second Book of Chronicles the Old Testament in the Christian Bible or of the second part of the Books of Chronicles in the Hebrew Bible. The book is compiled from older sources by an unknown person or group, designated by modern scholars as "the Chronicler", and had the final shape established in late fifth or fourth century BCE. This chapter belongs to the section focusing on the kingdom of Judah until its destruction by the Babylonians under Nebuchadnezzar and the beginning of restoration under Cyrus the Great of Persia  (2 Chronicles 10 to 36). The focus of this chapter (as all chapters from 17 to 20) is the reign of Jehoshaphat, king of Judah.

Text
This chapter was originally written in the Hebrew language and is divided into 34 verses.

Textual witnesses
Some early manuscripts containing the text of this chapter in Hebrew are of the Masoretic Text tradition, which includes the Aleppo Codex (10th century), and Codex Leningradensis (1008).

There is also a translation into Koine Greek known as the Septuagint, made in the last few centuries BCE. Extant ancient manuscripts of the Septuagint version include Codex Vaticanus (B; B; 4th century), and Codex Alexandrinus (A; A; 5th century).

Old Testament references
: 
: 
:

Analysis
This chapter parallels closely with 1 Kings 22:1–40 (especially from verse 4) with a different introduction (the Chronicles did not mention the three-year conflicts between the northern kingdom of Israel and Aram leading to the battle) and conclusion (shorter narrative of Ahab's death than 1 Kings 22), mainly to demonstrate that 'true YHWH-prophecy also existed in the northern kingdom'. The alliance with Ahab was Jehoshaphat's first of the two missteps (both involving the northern kingdom).

Jehoshaphat’s alliance with Ahab (18:1–11)
Verse 1 refers to 2 Chronicles 17:5 concerning Jehoshaphat's wealth and to 2 Kings 8:18, 27 about the marriage of Jehoshaphat's son, Joram, with Ahab's daughter, Athaliah (2 Chronicles 21:6; 22:2; cf. 2 Kings 8:18), probably driven by mutual political interests, but driving the royalty of Judah away from the Lord (2 Chronicles 21:6; 22:3–5).

Verse 1
Jehoshaphat had riches and honor in abundance; and by marriage he allied himself with Ahab.
Athaliah was also called "daughter" of Omri (father of Ahab) in 2 Kings 8:26 (which means "grand-daughter").

Micaiah's message of defeat (18:12–27)
Micaiah's speech describes a meeting of the Lord with his heavenly council (verses 18–22; cf. ; 2:1; Psalm 82:1) where the prophet was a witness to the conversation (cf. Jeremiah 23:18, 22).

Verse 27
And Micaiah said, "If you return in peace, the Lord has not spoken by me." And he said, "Hear, all you peoples!"
Cross references: 
The last words of the prophet Micaiah the son of Imlah ("hear all you peoples") are exactly the first words of the prophet Micah the Morasthite in the Book of Micah.

Death of Ahab, king of Israel (18:28–34)
This section parallels closely to with some differences in the last parts, such as in verse 34, the sentence [Ahab] "was (or, continued) holding himself up in the chariot, facing Aram, until the evening" is a clearer rendering of 1 Kings 22:35 which reads that [Ahab] "was held up in the chariot, ... and he died in the evening", as well as the omission of the remaining narrative regarding the return of the army and the washing of Ahab's chariot at the pool of Samaria (1 Kings 22:36-38), which did not concern Jehoshaphat.

See also

Related Bible parts: 1 Kings 22, 2 Kings 8, 2 Chronicles 21, Micah 1

Notes

References

Sources

 
 Thiele, Edwin R., The Mysterious Numbers of the Hebrew Kings, (1st ed.; New York: Macmillan, 1951; 2d ed.; Grand Rapids: Eerdmans, 1965; 3rd ed.; Grand Rapids: Zondervan/Kregel, 1983).

External links
 Jewish translations:
 Divrei Hayamim II - II Chronicles - Chapter 18 (Judaica Press) in Hebrew and English translation [with Rashi's commentary] at Chabad.org
 Christian translations:
 Online Bible at GospelHall.org (ESV, KJV, Darby, American Standard Version, Bible in Basic English)
 2 Chronicles Chapter 18. Bible Gateway

18